Recreational Records was a British record label set up in 1981 by the Bristol record shop and distributor Revolver Records. Originally formed as an independent record label with its own distribution as part of the Cartel.

Revolver Records and the Cartel
Revolver Records (not to be confused with Revolver Music) was a long established record store based at The Triangle, Clifton, Bristol, and in the 1970s was a hangout of Mark Stewart, Nick Sheppard, and other local musicians. It also had a distribution arm, which allowed it to distribute its own records (under the Recreational label) and those of other Indie labels (Monopause Records, etc.) via its participation in the Cartel.

The Cartel was a co-operative record distribution organisation in the United Kingdom, set up by a number of small independent record labels to handle their distribution to record shops. By pooling their resources it allowed them to compete with the larger distribution operations of the major record labels, and also to gain access to the larger shop chains. The association of regional distributors included some of the most notable labels of the 1980s UK post-punk and indie scene: Backs (Norwich), Fast Forward (Edinburgh), Native (Sheffield), Nine Mile (Leamington Spa), Probe (Liverpool), Revolver (Bristol), Red Rhino (York) and Rough Trade (London).

Artists
 Animal Magic: Were "a brassy Bristol sextet led by vocalist Howard Purse, they swiftly developed from a punk to a hardcore dancefloor sensibility."
 Electric Guitars: Their first single was on Fried Egg Records and they had tracks on the first Bristol Recorder, before their Recreational single. They later went on to join Stiff Records and release a further two singles.
 Ivory Coasters: Afro beat/Highlife band that at one time included Prince Nico Mbarga. They also released the 12" single 'Roscoe/Kinzengi Nzengi/1Z4IC', on Politone (PT001) in 1981.
 Mouth: After their single on Recreational, this funk band went on to release records on the Y label, including the track 'Voyage to the Bottom of the Sea', on the 1982 'Birth of the Y' compilation LP.
 Scream And Dance: Tribal funk band. ‘In Rhythm’ was remixed by DJ Marcelle/Another Nice Mess and released on a German double LP, ‘Meets Her Soulmates At Faust Studio Deejay Laboratory’ in 2008.
 Talisman: A multi-racial Reggae Band who provided the labels very first single and UK Indie Chart hit (#17). Dole Age also became Single of the Week and the Record Sleeve of the Year in the NME. In 1982 as well as playing the Glastonbury Festival, they were the opening act for The Rolling Stones concert at Ashton Gate, Bristol.
 The X-Certs: Started off as a Punk Band in 1978 and recorded several tracks for Heartbeat Records, had two tracks on Bristol Recorder 2, and were including reggae by the time of their 1981 Recreational single. This was to be their last recording as they split up in early 1981.

Releases
The Recreational catalogue listed singles with the Sport prefix (some had 7" and 12" versions), apart from The X-Certs 7" single Together/Untogether, which is listed as Play 1.

Singles

Reissues on other labels
Bristol Archive Records are currently providing Recreational back catalogue tracks for download, through the usual outlets (Amazon, iTunes, etc.).

See also
 List of Bands from Bristol
 Culture of Bristol
 List of Record Labels from Bristol
 Bristol Record Labels
 Bristol Archive Records
 Electric Guitars
 the Cartel
 List of record labels

References

External links
Recreational Records at Discogs.com
Recreational Discography in Japanese at Disc Shop Zero
[ Electric Guitars at Allmusic]
Electric Guitars discography at Discogs.com
Talisman biography at Bristol Archive Records
The X-Certs website
The X-Certs biography at Bristol Archive Records

Record labels established in 1981
British independent record labels
Indie rock record labels
Music in Bristol